Parus ( meaning Sail), also Tsyklon-B or Tsiklon-B ( meaning Cyclone-B) and Tsikada-M ( meaning Cicada-M), GRAU index 11F627, is a Russian, previously Soviet satellite constellation used for communication and navigation. As of 2010, 99 Parus satellites have been launched, starting with Kosmos 700 in 1974. All launches have been conducted using Kosmos-3M carrier rockets, flying from sites 132 and 133 at the Plesetsk Cosmodrome.

The prime function of Parus satellites is to provide location information for Tsiklon-B navigation system.

Parus satellites are produced by JSC Information Satellite Systems (formerly NPO PM), based on the KAUR-1 satellite bus. They are operated by the Russian Aerospace Defence Forces, and are used primarily for navigation, Store and forward communication, and to relay data from US-P satellites. Some of the navigation functions are believed to have been superseded by the GLONASS system.

See also
Strela (satellite)

References

Communications satellites of the Soviet Union
Navigation satellite constellations
Navigation satellites of the Soviet Union
Satellites using the KAUR bus